Statistics of the Primera División de México for the 1973–74 season.

Overview

Ciudad Madero was promoted to Primera División.

This season was contested by 18 teams, and Cruz Azul won the championship.

San Luis was relegated to Segunda División.

UDG acquired Torreón franchise to reach the Primera Division for the 1974-75 season.

Segunda División semifinalists, UASLP-Pumas (re-branded to Atlético Potosino) and Unión de Curtidores were promoted to the Primera División to increase the number of teams to 20 for the 1974-75 season.

Teams

Group stage

Group 1

Group 2

Results

Relegation playoff

Laguna won 2-0 on aggregate. San Luis relegated to Segunda Division.

Championship playoff

Bracket

Semifinal

Cruz Azul won 7-2 on aggregate.

Atlético Español won 6-5 on aggregate.

Final

Cruz Azul won 4-2 on aggregate.

References
Mexico - List of final tables (RSSSF)

Liga MX seasons
Mex
1973–74 in Mexican football